João Cunha is the name of:

João Cunha (footballer), Portuguese footballer
João Cunha (jiu-jitsu), Brazilian martial artist
João Cunha (politician), Brazilian politician
João Cunha e Silva, Portuguese tennis player
João Paulo Cunha, Brazilian politician
João Lourenço da Cunha, Portuguese nobleman